The Metropolitan University is a private-owned university located in Belgrade, Serbia. The university came as the join of the Faculty of Information Technology (FIT) (founded in 2005) and other governing departments of the university in 2010, which previously existed as an individual institution.

The founder and rector, Dragan Domazet, was the Minister of Science of the Republic of Serbia from 2001 to 2004.

Centers 

The university consist of three centers (individual faculties):
 Faculty of Information Technology
 Faculty of Management
 Faculty of Digital Arts

See also
 Education in Serbia
 List of universities in Serbia

References

External links

 Institutional account in Academia.edu

Universities in Belgrade
Educational institutions established in 2005
2005 establishments in Serbia